The 2012 WNBA Finals was the series for the 2012 season of the Women's National Basketball Association (WNBA), and the conclusion of the season's playoffs. The Minnesota Lynx, champions of the Western Conference, faced the Indiana Fever, champions of the Eastern Conference.  The Fever defeated the Lynx three games to one becoming only the second Eastern Conference franchise to capture a WNBA title.

The WNBA Finals were under a 2–2–1 rotation. The Lynx held home-court advantage as they had a better regular season record (27–7) than the Fever (22–12). The Lynx were defending their 2011 WNBA Championship. The Fever appeared in the 2009 Finals.

Background

2012 WNBA regular season

2012 WNBA Playoffs

Indiana Fever

The Indiana Fever finished 22–12, good for second place in the Eastern Conference. The Fever lost their first playoff game against the Atlanta Dream, but rallied to win two straight elimination games, setting up a conference final against the Connecticut Sun. Once again, Indiana lost the first game of the series, but rallied to win two straight to reach the finals for the second time in four years.

Minnesota Lynx

The Minnesota Lynx finished with the best record in the WNBA for the second straight year, finishing with a 27–7 record. The Lynx were taken to three games by the Seattle Storm, winning Game 3 by one point. The Lynx then swept the Los Angeles Sparks in the Western Conference Finals, which gave them a chance to defend their 2011 WNBA title.

Regular-season series
The Minnesota Lynx won the season series 2–0:

Series summary
All times are in Eastern Daylight Time (UTC−4).

Game 1

Game 2

Game 3

Game 4

Rosters

References

Finals
Women's National Basketball Association Finals
WNBA Finals
WNBA Finals
WNBA Finals
Indiana Fever
Minnesota Lynx
2010s in Minneapolis
2010s in Indianapolis
Basketball competitions in Minneapolis
Basketball competitions in Indianapolis